Sascha Müller (born 24 April 1970) is a German politician of the Alliance 90/The Greens who has been serving as a member of the Bundestag after the 2021 German federal election.

References

External links 
 

Living people
1970 births
Politicians from Essen
21st-century German politicians
Members of the Bundestag for Alliance 90/The Greens
Members of the Bundestag 2021–2025